The Sanskrit term adhiṣṭhāna (kaji;  àtíttǎan) is the name for initiations or blessings in Vajrayana Buddhism.  The term has various meanings, including the raised base on which a temple stands.

Nomenclature, orthography and etymology
Adhiṣṭhāna(m) is a term with multiple meanings: seat; basis; substratum; ground; support; and abode. The Monier-Williams Sanskrit-English Dictionary Online holds the following semantic field for adhiṣṭhāna:
 [noun] standing by, being at hand, approach  
 standing or resting upon
 a basis, base
 the standing-place of the warrior upon the car
 a position, site, residence, abode, seat
 a settlement, town, standing over
 government, authority, power
 a precedent, rule
 a benediction (Buddhism)

Francesca Fremantle gives an etymology of Sanskrit adhiṣṭhāna and Tibetan jinlap: "The Sanskrit word literally means "standing over" and conveys ideas of taking possession, dwelling within, presence, protection, and sovereignty. The Tibetan literally means "an engulfing wave or flood of splendor and power."

Dan Martin opines that the Chinese term for adhiṣṭhāna influenced the Tibetan:

Vajrayana

Tibetan Buddhism
Tsultrim Allione points out that in Tibetan Buddhism adhistana blessings are an important part of the pointing-out instruction received from the guru and lineage.  Receiving these blessings is dependent on the student having proper motivation, aspiration and intentionality (bodhicitta) and sufficient "devotion" (Sanskrit: bhakti).  These blessings may be received from the student's guru during initiation, from the yidam during deity yoga, or simply from being in the presence of holy objects such as a stupa or the śarīra, "relics", kept inside them. These objects are held to emanate or incite adhiṣṭhāna "blessings, grace" within the mindstream and experience of those connected to them.

Stream of blessings
This metaphorical usage of "stream, wave, thread, continuum" is reinforced in philosophy with the mindstream doctrine and its relationship to tantric sādhanā, where it is used in visualizations and invocations, particularly in relation to the Three Vajras of Padmasambhava and depicted in Indo-Tibetan Buddhist and Bon iconography such as representations of the Adi-Buddha and Tapihritsa. Martin Mills, in a modern political and power-relations dissection of jinlap in relation to hierarchical structures of the Gelug, a Sarma (second-wave) school, holds that:

An example of this sādhanā is described in The Prayer of Inspiration known as "The Falling Rain of Blessings" (gsol 'debs byin rlabs char 'bebs) (from the Yang Zab Nyingpo).

Shingon Buddhism
In Shingon Buddhism, an extant non-Himalayan school of Vajrayana, practices involving mantras, mudras, and visualisation exercises aim at achieving honzon kaji or union with the deity. According to Shingon priest Eijun Eidson:

Minoru Kiyota identifies three kinds of adhiṣṭhāna in the theory and practice of Shingon Buddhism: 
mudra, the finger sign 
dhāraṇī, secret verses
yoga, through meditation practices.

The term adhiṣṭhāna is also used to describe the transformative power of the Buddha. According to D. T. Suzuki:

Cucumber blessing 

The cucumber blessing is an adhiṣṭhāna practised at Shingon Buddhist temples in summer. In a cucumber blessing meeting, the priest and believers together pray that they can pass the season of hot summer in good health like fresh cucumbers. Kūkai, the founder of Shingon Buddhism, is said to have initiated this practice of blessing.

See also
Shaktipat

References

External links 
 Kaji

Buddhist devotion
Shingon Buddhism
Tibetan Buddhism